Petermann Island is a small, low and rounded island,  lying off the northwest coast of Kyiv Peninsula in Graham Land, Antarctica, a short distance south of Booth Island and the Lemaire Channel.  It is a popular tourist destination.

Description
It has volcanic origins, with about half the land surface covered by a permanent, crevassed icecap. Ice-free areas have a sparse vegetation of mosses and lichens. The bedrock of the island is granodiorite,

History
The island was discovered by a German expedition of 1873–74, who named it after geographer August Petermann. The French Antarctic Expedition of 1908-10 wintered over aboard ship in a cove on the southeast side of the island, named Port Circumcision because it was spotted 1 January 1909, the traditional day for the Feast of the Circumcision.

Huts built by the expedition are gone, although a cairn remains, along with a refuge hut built by Argentina in 1955, and a cross commemorating three members of the British Antarctic Survey who died in a 1982 attempt to cross the sea ice from Petermann to Faraday Station.

Geography 

A large number of locations on the island have been individually charted and named. Unless otherwise specified, the following features were first charted by the French Antarctic Expedition during their winter on the island, and named by Captain Jean-Baptiste Charcot.

Rouch Point forms the northwest end of Petermann Island. It was named for Jules Rouch, the expedition's oceanographer. Godfroy Point marks the northern extremity of the island. It was named by Captain Charcot for Rene Godfroy, sub-lieutenant on the Pourquoi-Pas. Liouville Point marks the northeast end of the island. It was named for J. Liouville, the expedition's zoologist.

Depeaux Point forms the south end of the island. Port Circumcision is a cove indenting the southeast side of Petermann Island. It was discovered on January 1, 1909. In the Roman Catholic calendar, this date is the Feast of the Circumcision of Christ, for which Captain Charcot named the cove. The cove served as a base for the Pourquoi-Pas during the 1909 winter season.

It was named Megalestris after an obsolete generic name for the south polar skua, which are found on the island. A cairn with a lead plaque was erected on the hill in 1909. The original plaque has since been removed to the Museum National d’Histoire Naturelle in Paris, but the cairn, with a replica plaque, has been designated a Historic Site or Monument (HSM 27), following a proposal by Argentina, France and the United Kingdom to the Antarctic Treaty Consultative Meeting.

Important Bird Area 

The island has been identified as an Important Bird Area (IBA) by BirdLife International because it supports a breeding colony of about 3,000 pairs of gentoo penguins.  Other birds nesting at the site in smaller numbers include Adélie penguins, imperial shags, Wilson's storm petrels and south polar skuas.

Groussac Refuge

Groussac Refuge is an Argentine naval refuge (originally called Hippolyte Bouchard) in Antarctica, located on the southern coast of the Port Circumcision, on Petermann Island, next to the west coast of the Antarctic Peninsula. The refuge was inaugurated on February 6, 1955 and is operated by the Argentine Navy and was occupied periodically by personnel of the British Antarctic Survey of the former Faraday Station.
The refuge is in the middle of a colony of Gentoo penguins. Its current name is in honour of Paul Groussac, a French writer and historian who lived in Argentina and authored a plea on the Argentine claim of the Malvinas Islands and biographies of Argentine national heroes.

See also 
 List of Antarctic and sub-Antarctic islands
 List of Antarctic field camps

References

External links

 Secretariat of the Antarctic Treaty Visitor Guidelines and island description
 Personal photographic account from March 2007

Islands of Antarctica
Important Bird Areas of Antarctica
Seabird colonies
Tourism sites in Antarctica
Penguin colonies